Events from the 1560s in Denmark.

Incumbents
 Monarch – Frederick II
 Steward of the Realm – Peder Oxe (from 1567)

Events

 1561 – Æbelholt Abbey is demolished by royal order and much of its stone is used to construct Frederiksborg Castle.
 1565 – Herlufsholm School is established in Copenhagen.

Northern Seven Years' War 
The Northern Seven Years' War broke out in 1563 between the Kingdom of Sweden and a coalition of Denmark–Norway, Lübeck, and Poland–Lithuania. The conflict was resolved in 1570 with the Treaty of Stettin.
 30 May 1563 – Battle of Bornholm
 11 September 1563 – Battle of Öland
 9 November 1563 – Battle of Mared
 30–31 May 1564 – First battle of Öland
 12 July 1564 – Action of 12 July 1564
 14 August 1564 – Action of 14 August 1564
 4 September 1564 – The Ronneby Bloodbath take place in Ronneby.
 21 May 1565 – Battle of Rügen
 4 June 1565 – Action of 4 June 1565
 7 July 1565 – Action of 7 July 1565
 20 October 1565 – Battle of Axtorna
 26 July 1566 – Action of 26 July 1566
 9 August 1566 – Battle of Brobacka
 18 and 22 November 1568 – the Treaties of Roskilde were negotiated, but ultimately not ratified.
 November 1569 – Siege of Varberg

Births
1562
 3 March – Gellio Sasceride, astronomer and physician (died 1610)
 4 October – Christen Sørensen Longomontanus, astronomer (died 1647)
1566
 18 November – Sivert Beck, landowner and treasurer (died 1623)
1567
 June 25 – Jacob Ulfeldt, diplomat, explorer, and chancellor (died 1630)
Full date unknown

 c. 1569 Pieter Isaacsz, painter (died 1625)

Deaths
1560
 3 January – Peder Palladius, bishop (born 1503)
1561
 11 November – Hans Tausen, Lutheran theologian (born 1494)
1565
 21 June – Jørgen Thygesen Brahe, nobleman (born 1515)
 25 June – Herluf Trolle, admiral (born 1516)
 11 October – Otte Rud, admiral during the Northern Seven Years' War, died in Swedish captivity (born 1520)
 12 December – Johan Rantzau, general and statesman (born 1492)
1569
 29 June – Otte Krumpen, Marshal (born 1480)
 9 October – Mogens Gyldenstierne (born 1480s)

References

1560s in Denmark
Denmark
Years of the 16th century in Denmark